Thryssa gautamiensis, the gautama thryssa, is a species of amphidromous ray-finned fish in the family Engraulidae.

Description
It is distributed throughout the eastern coast of India, around Sri Lanka, and possibly Myanmar.
It is a small schooling fish found in depth of 20-50m. Maximum length do not exceed 21.5 cm. The fish lack dorsal soft rays and only present 34 to 37 anal soft rays.

See also
List of common commercial fish of Sri Lanka

References

IUCN Red List
A New Anchovy, Thryssa gautamiensis n. sp. (Pisces: Engraulidae), from the Godavari Estuary, India
WoRMS
Whitehead, P.J.P., G.J. Nelson and T. Wongratana, 1988. FAO Species Catalogue. Vol. 7. Clupeoid fishes of the world (Suborder Clupeoidei). An annotated and illustrated catalogue of the herrings, sardines, pilchards, sprats, shads, anchovies and wolf-herrings. FAO Fish. Synop. 125(7/2):305-579. Rome: FAO. 

Fish of India
Fish described in 1971
gautamiensis